This list includes the Roman names of countries, or significant regions, known to the Roman Empire.

References

External links
Dr. J. G. Th. Grässe, Orbis Latinus: Lexikon lateinischer geographischer Namen des Mittelalters und der Neuzeit, online at the Bavarian State Library 
Grässe, Orbis Latinus, online at Columbia University 

Countries
Lists of country names
la:Nationes mundi